Julien Torma (Cambrai, 6 April 1902 – Tyrol, 17 February 1933) was credited as a French writer, playwright and poet who was part of the Dadaist movement.

Torma disappeared in the mountains of the Tyrol at the age of 30. Due to his secretive behaviour and the impossibility of verifying the supposed details of his life (i.e. no living or known family members and  every writer he supposedly knew having died long before the publication of his posthumous books - if they are by the author of the early books, no professional career, no fixed address, his body having never been recovered, etc.), it has been suggested by some, including Jean-François Jeandillou, that Torma's existence may be fictitious. His purported birthday, 6 April, is marked as "the birthday of pataphysics" in the "pataphysics calendar". The real writer who authored the first four publications and Porte battantes would have had to be using a pen name, as, according to the French institute for statistics INSEE, only three Torma births have been recorded in France since 1891, all between 1941 and 1965.

Publications
 The Obscure Lamp (1919) 
 The Big Troche (1925)
 Cuts (1926) 
 Euphorisms (1926)

Posthumous publications
 Lebordelamer (1955)
 Le Bétrou (1955)
 Porte Battante (1963)
 Grabuge (1998)
 Definitively incomplete writings (2003)

See also
 List of people who disappeared

Notes

References
 4 Dada Suicides: Selected Texts of Arthur Cravan, Jacques Rigaut, Julien Torma & Jacques Vache (Anti-Classics of Dada) by Torma, Jacques Rigaut, Jacques Vache, and Arthur Cravan. Edited by Roger Conover, Terry J. Hale, Paul Lenti and Iain White. (1995) Atlas Press; 
 Julien Torma in Paris

1902 births
1930s missing person cases
20th-century French male writers
20th-century French poets
Dada
French male poets
Missing person cases in Austria
Pataphysicians
Year of death unknown